Coke Tunes was an online music store in New Zealand run by the Coca-Cola Amatil. Coke Tunes had over 700,000 tracks as of January 1, 2006. Coke Tunes uses Microsoft's DRM and Windows Media Audio 9.1.

Coke Tunes was, at one time, New Zealand's largest music store.  It closed in May 2007.

Compatibility 
Because of use of Microsoft's DRM technology, Apple iPod users cannot listen to downloaded tracks because iTunes cannot convert DRM protected Windows Media Audio files.

The music store can only be accessed by Microsoft's Internet Explorer browser due to the use of embedded Windows Media Player to sample tracks.

External links
Coke Tunes
Coke Fridge
Coke.co.nz

Online music stores of New Zealand